Mell's gecko (Gekko melli) is a species of lizard in the family Gekkonidae. The species is endemic to China.

Etymology
The specific name, melli, is in honor of a Mr. Mell of the Natural History Museum, Berlin.

Geographic range
G. melli is found in northeastern Guangdong Province and southern Jiangxi Province. Both provinces are in southern China.

Description
Its colour pattern is very variable. Unlike most species of its genus, it lacks dorsal tubercles.

Reproduction
G. melli is oviparous.

References

Further reading
Rösler H, Tiedemann F (2007). "Gekko melli Vogt, 1922 and its types (Reptilia, Sauria, Gekkonidae)". Mitteilungen aus dem Museum für Naturkunde in Berlin 83 (S1): 105–108.
Vogt T (1922). "Zur Reptilien- und Amphibienfauna Südchinas ". Archiv für Naturgeschichte 88A (10): 135–146. (Gecko melli, new species, p. 136). (in German).
Yang J-H, Wang Y-Y, Zhang T-D, Sun Y-J, Lin S-S (2012). "Genetic and morphological evidence on the species validity of Gekko melli Vogt, 1922 with notes on its diagnosis and range extension (Squamata: Gekkonidae)". Zootaxa '''3505: 67–74.

Gekko
Reptiles described in 1922
Endemic fauna of China
Reptiles of China